Subantarctia is a genus of Polynesian araneomorph spiders in the family Orsolobidae, first described by Raymond Robert Forster in 1955.

Species
 it contains nine species, found only in New Zealand:
Subantarctia centralis Forster & Platnick, 1985 – New Zealand
Subantarctia dugdalei Forster, 1956 – New Zealand
Subantarctia fiordensis Forster, 1956 – New Zealand
Subantarctia florae Forster, 1956 – New Zealand
Subantarctia muka Forster & Platnick, 1985 – New Zealand
Subantarctia penara Forster & Platnick, 1985 – New Zealand
Subantarctia stewartensis Forster, 1956 – New Zealand
Subantarctia trina Forster & Platnick, 1985 – New Zealand
Subantarctia turbotti Forster, 1955 (type) – New Zealand (Auckland Is.)

See also
 List of Orsolobidae species

References

Araneomorphae genera
Orsolobidae
Spiders of New Zealand
Taxa named by Raymond Robert Forster
Endemic spiders of New Zealand